Kaduna Golf Club (since 1921) is a golf club located in Kaduna, Kaduna State Nigeria. The golf club is the first golf club in Northern Nigeria with a number of more than 750 members, it has a single golf course with a distance of 0.9 km and potting surface of 18 green holes which made it one of the largest golf club in Nigeria. The chairman Board of Trustees Kaduna Golf Club is His excellency the Emir of Birnin Gwari, Alhaji Zubairu Maigwari.

References

Sport in Nigeria
1921 establishments in Nigeria
Sports venues completed in 1921
Sports clubs in Kaduna state
Golf clubs and courses in Nigeria
Sports venues in Kaduna State
Kaduna
Tourist attractions in Kaduna State
20th-century architecture in Nigeria